Aspergillus villosus is a species of fungus in the genus Aspergillus. It is from the Robusti section. The species was first described in 2017. It has been isolated in the UK and from a painting in France. It has been reported to produce asperphenamate, indole alkaloid A, and asperphenamate.

References 

villosus
Fungi described in 2017